Maury is an unincorporated community and census-designated place (CDP) in Greene County, North Carolina, United States. Its population was 1,685 as of the 2010 census. Maury has a post office with ZIP code 28554. North Carolina Highway 123 and North Carolina Highway 903 intersect in the community.

Demographics

References

Census-designated places in North Carolina
Census-designated places in Greene County, North Carolina
Unincorporated communities in North Carolina
Unincorporated communities in Greene County, North Carolina